Mark S. Weiner is an American writer, web-based documentary filmmaker, and legal historian. He retains the position of professor of law at Rutgers University School of Law—Newark, where he teaches constitutional law and legal history, though he turned to a full-time writing career in 2012 and stopped actively teaching at the school. He blogs at his website Worlds of Law.

Weiner received his A.B. from Stanford University, where he graduated with Honors and Distinction and was elected to Phi Beta Kappa. He holds a J.D. from Yale Law School and a Ph.D. in American Studies from Yale University, where he was awarded a Jacob K. Javits Fellowship from the United States Department of Education, a Samuel I. Golieb Fellowship in Legal History from New York University School of Law, and a dissertation fellowship from the Whiting Foundation.  He received a fellowship from the National Endowment for the Humanities in 2001.  In 2009 he was a Fulbright Scholar at the University of Akureyri, Iceland.

He is the author of three books: The Rule of the Clan: What an Ancient Form of Social Organization Reveals about the Future of Individual Freedom (Farrar, Straus, and Giroux, 2013), Americans without Law: The Racial Boundaries of Citizenship (New York University Press, 2006), and Black Trials: Citizenship from the Beginnings of Slavery to the End of Caste (Alfred A. Knopf, 2004). The Rule of the Clan received the 2015 Grawemeyer Award for Ideas Improving World Order. Black Trials was selected a 2005 Silver Gavel Award winner by the American Bar Association for its contribution to the public understanding of law. Americans Without Law was awarded the President's Book Award from the Social Science History Association (see juridical racialism).

Weiner has written numerous articles about a wide variety of topics involving law, culture, and historical consciousness. Topics of his work include the memory of medieval law in modern Iceland, the Argentinean statesman Domingo Sarmiento, kinship and legal identity in Muslim societies, the history of Coca-Cola, and corporate food museums. He has likewise published poems on historical themes in the experimental journal Rethinking History. Other notable publications include "New Biographical Evidence on Somerset's Case," in Slavery & Abolition (2002).

Weiner has produced short documentary videos about legal history and comparative law. His work includes videos about the Napoleonic Code Bedouin law, "Why German Law is Like Music," the use of stone and glass in European Union legal buildings, and judicial bobbleheads.

Weiner is the godson of the photographer Stuart Klipper. He is married to Stephanie Kuduk Weiner, an English professor at Wesleyan University.

Works 

Americans Without Law: The Racial Boundaries of Citizenship. New York University Press, New York City, NY.
Black Trials: Citizenship from the Beginnings of Slavery to the End of Caste.  Alfred A. Knopf, New York City, NY.   (0-375-40981-5)
The Rule of the Clan: What an Ancient Form of Social Organization Reveals about the Future of Individual Freedom. Farrar, Straus, and Giroux, New York, NY. .

http://www.worldsoflaw.com

References 

Year of birth missing (living people)
Living people
American legal scholars
Rutgers School of Law–Newark faculty
Stanford University alumni
Yale Law School alumni